An abrasion is a partial thickness wound caused by damage to the skin and can be superficial involving only the epidermis to deep, involving the deep dermis. Abrasions usually involve minimal bleeding.   Mild abrasions, also known as grazes or scrapes, do not scar or bleed because the dermis is left intact, but deep abrasions that disrupt the normal dermal structures may lead to the formation of scar tissue. A more traumatic abrasion that removes all layers of skin is called an avulsion.

Abrasion injuries most commonly occur when exposed skin comes into moving contact with a rough surface, causing a grinding or rubbing away of the upper layers of the epidermis.

By degree

 A first-degree abrasion involves only epidermal injury.
 A second-degree abrasion involves the epidermis as well as the dermis and may bleed slightly.
 A third-degree abrasion involves damage to the subcutaneous layer and the skin and is often called an avulsion.

Treatment
The abrasion should be cleaned and any debris removed. A topical antibiotic (such as neomycin or bacitracin) should be applied to prevent infection and to keep the wound moist. Dressing the wound is beneficial because it helps keep the wound from drying out, providing a moist environment conducive for healing. If the abrasion is painful, a topical analgesic (such as lidocaine or benzocaine) can be applied, but for large abrasions, a systemic analgesic may be necessary. Avoid exposing abraded skin to the sun as permanent hyperpigmentation can develop.

Healing
The gallery below shows the healing process for an abrasion on the palm caused by sliding on concrete.

See also 
 Chafing (skin)
 List of cutaneous conditions
 Contusion
 Laceration

References

External links 

Skin conditions resulting from physical factors